Big Big World is the debut studio album by Swedish recording artist Emilia Rydberg. It was released on 23 October 1998.

Commercial performance
The album was certified platinum in Norway and Sweden and gold in Switzerland. The album has sold 200,000 units in Scandinavia while the single "Big Big World" has reached the platinum status (30,000 units) in Sweden only in 11 days. The single stayed in number 1 spot for seven consecutive weeks and it has passed 100,000 units in Sweden.

Track listing 
All songs Written by Emilia Rydberg & Lasse "Yogi" Anderson
Good Sign – 3:02
Big Big World – 3:22
Come into My Life – 3:17
Twist of Fate – 3:45
Like Chocolate – 3:03
What About Me? – 3:30
Life (Will Never Be The Same) – 3:08
Daddy's Girl – 2:58
Adam & Eve – 4:24
Maybe, Baby – 3:08
Big Big World (TNT's Big Phat Mix) 3:12
Maybe, Baby (Swing Style) 3:24

Contributors 
Emilia Rydberg – vocals, composer
Lasse Anderson – composer
Johan Granström – bass
Peter Ljung – keyboards
Göran Elmquist – guitar
Christer Jansson – drums, percussion

Charts

Year-end charts

Certifications

References 

1998 debut albums
Emilia Rydberg albums
Universal Music Group albums